The Blue Gum High Forest of the Sydney Basin Bioregion is a wet sclerophyll forest found in the northern parts of Sydney, New South Wales, Australia. It has been classified as critically endangered, under the New South Wales government's Threatened Species Conservation Act 1995. The principal canopy trees in this forest community are Sydney blue gum and blackbutt which are usually seen between 20 and 40 metres tall. 180 species of indigenous plants have been identified at Dalrymple-Hay Nature Reserve.

Distribution 
The Blue Gum High Forest is restricted to the northern parts of Sydney, on soils based on shale with an annual rainfall over 1100 mm (43 in). Much of it grew on the ridge tops, roughly following the present day Pacific Highway from around Crows Nest up to Hornsby. Also it was recorded on soils based on the Mittagong Formation, volcanic diatremes and exposed shale lenses within the Hawkesbury Sandstone. Blue Gum High Forest grades into Turpentine-Ironbark Forest in drier areas of lower rainfall.

Remnants are found as far west as West Pennant Hills and Eastwood, though most of the few remaining areas are in suburbs such as Pymble, Turramurra and Wahroonga. Turiban Reserve in Wahroonga has particularly tall trees. Two of the larger forest remnants are Dalrymple-Hay Nature Reserve and Sheldon Forest. Around one percent of the original forest remains, and the current remnants amount to an area of 136 hectares (336 acres).

Ecological status

Due to fragmentation and the surrounding urban area, the forest remnants are constantly under threat from invasive plant species. Bush regeneration programs have been put in place for many years. Significant species include Wandering Jew, Madeira vine, passionfruit vine, Chinese privet, ochna and camphor laurel.

Fauna 
Ring-tail possums, sugar gliders, brushtail possums and grey-headed flying foxes are common. There are occasional sightings of wallabies. Birds include rainbow lorikeet (Trichoglossus moluccanus), Australian king parrot (Alisterus scapularis), crimson rosella (Platycercus elegans), currawongs, variegated fairywren (Malurus lamberti), black-faced cuckoo-shrike (Coracina novaehollandiae), superb fairywren (Malurus cyaneus), powerful owl (Ninox strenua), glossy black cockatoo (Calyptorhynchus lathami) and silvereyes. The yellow-bellied sheathtail-bat (Saccolaimus flaviventris) is present though seldom seen.

Flora

See also 

 List of threatened ecological communities declared by the Commonwealth of Australia
 Blue Mountains Shale Cap Forest

References 

Geography of Sydney
Forests of New South Wales
Eastern Australian temperate forests
Sclerophyll forests